The 2018–19 FIA Formula E Championship was the fifth season of the FIA Formula E championship, a motor racing championship for electrically-powered vehicles recognised by motorsport's governing body, the Fédération Internationale de l'Automobile (FIA), as the highest class of competition for electric open-wheel racing cars.

The 2018–19 season saw the introduction of the all-new Gen2, second generation Formula E car, which boasted significant technological advances over the previous Spark-Renault SRT 01E chassis – its power output rose from 200 kW to 250 kW and top speeds rose to around 280 km/h (174 mph). The arrival of the Gen2 car also saw an end to the series’ mid-race car-swaps.

Frenchman Jean-Éric Vergne entered as the defending Drivers’ Champion after securing his first title at the New York City ePrix, while Audi Sport Abt Schaeffler returned as defending Teams’ Champions – having beaten Vergne's Techeetah team by a narrow two point margin.

The 2019 Hong Kong ePrix was the 50th race of Formula E since its inception in 2014. Formula E has raced in 22 cities in 17 countries across five continents and has seen 13 global manufactures compete in the series. Four drivers have started every Formula E race; they are Lucas di Grassi, Sam Bird, Daniel Abt and Jérôme d'Ambrosio.

The 2018–19 season was the first to have an official support category since Greenpower ran the Schools Series during Formula E's debut 2014–15 season. The Jaguar I-Pace eTrophy featured at 10 of the 13 rounds of the calendar.

After the first race in New York City, Jean-Éric Vergne secured enough points to become the Drivers' Champion, winning his second Formula E championship. Techeetah won their first constructor's championship.

Teams and drivers 
All teams used the Spark Gen2 chassis.

Team changes 
 BMW entered Formula E as a manufacturer, partnering with Andretti Autosport.
 Mercedes affiliate HWA entered the championship and establish a technical partnership with Venturi. The agreement sees HWA receive powertrains for the 2018–19 season, serving as a precursor to Mercedes' entry as a manufacturer team in the 2019–20 season.
 Nissan entered the championship as a manufacturer replacing partner company Renault in their partnership with DAMS. Renault cited a desire to concentrate on their Formula One programme as their motivation for leaving Formula E.
 Techeetah switched from Renault to DS Automobiles powertrain, becoming DS Performance's partner. Meanwhile, Virgin Racing switched to use an Audi powertrain.

Driver changes
 Former Sauber, Ferrari and Williams Formula One driver Felipe Massa made his Formula E debut with Venturi. Massa replaced Maro Engel; Tom Dillmann moved to Nio Formula E Team to replace Luca Filippi.
 Nico Prost left the e.dams team at the end of the 2017–18 season.
 Alexander Sims made his race debut with BMW i Andretti Motorsport alongside regular driver António Félix da Costa.
 Felix Rosenqvist left Mahindra Racing to join Chip Ganassi Racing in the IndyCar Series. He was replaced by former Manor and Sauber Formula One driver and 2015 Deutsche Tourenwagen Masters champion Pascal Wehrlein. On 15 November 2018, it was announced that Rosenqvist will drive the opening round for Mahindra in place of Wehrlein.
 Nick Heidfeld was replaced in the other Mahindra car by Jérôme d'Ambrosio, who moved to the team from Dragon Racing.  Jerome d'Ambrosio in turn was replaced at Dragon by former FIA Formula 2 Championship driver Maximilian Günther.
 Robin Frijns returned to Formula E as a Virgin Racing driver, replacing Alex Lynn.
 Former McLaren Formula One driver and 2015 GP2 Series Champion Stoffel Vandoorne and 2018 Deutsche Tourenwagen Masters champion Gary Paffett made their race debut with HWA Racelab.
FIA Formula 2 Championship driver Alexander Albon was originally due to drive for Nissan e.dams but was released from his contract less than 3 weeks before the start of the season to instead drive in the 2019 Formula One World Championship for Toro Rosso. Oliver Rowland, who drove one race in the 2015-16 Formula E championship will replace Albon.

Mid-season changes
 After three races in the season, Maximilian Günther was replaced by former Sauber Formula One driver and current Action Express Racing IMSA WeatherTech SportsCar Championship driver Felipe Nasr. Günther returned to Dragon Racing at the Rome ePrix as Nasr drove at the IMSA Long Beach round that weekend. Despite Nasr being scheduled to miss the Rome ePrix he was due to be back for the next race in Paris but Günther stayed on to contest the rest of the season.
 Halfway through the season, Nelson Piquet Jr. left the Jaguar team after the Sanya ePrix. He was replaced by Alex Lynn for the remainder of the season.

Calendar

The 2018–19 championship was contested over thirteen rounds in Europe, Africa, Asia, the Middle East, North America and South America.

Calendar changes

 The series returned to Monaco as the Monaco ePrix is run as a biennial event that alternates with the Historic Grand Prix of Monaco.
 Formula E made its debut in Saudi Arabia with the race to take place on a street circuit in the Ad Diriyah district of Riyadh. The event replaced the Hong Kong ePrix as the opening round of the championship.
 The championship was due to race in São Paulo for the first time. The race had originally been included on the 2017–18 Formula E season calendar before being delayed for one year and replaced with the Punta del Este ePrix. However, the São Paulo race was not included on the provisional calendar published in June 2018 and the Punta del Este race was removed from the schedule.
 A new ePrix in Mainland China was added to the calendar with the Hainan resort city of Sanya named as the venue. The series had previously raced in Beijing.
 The Santiago ePrix changed its location from Parque Forestal to a bespoke circuit in O'Higgins Park. The move was made following complaints by the residents of Barrio Lastarria, who argued against the original track layout.
 The Swiss ePrix was moved from Zürich  to Bern after the former's city officials expressed concerns about the ability of the city's infrastructure to handle a series of large-scale events in quick succession. Organisers have the option to return to Zürich in future seasons.

European Races

A separate competition within the overall Formula E Championship structure which includes all European cities that are part of the calendar has been included. The driver who achieves the best podium finishes of all five races will be awarded a trophy produced by voestalpine.

Changes

Technical regulations

 The Spark-Renault SRT 01E, which was used by the championship since its inaugural season, was replaced by a brand-new chassis. The new chassis, which was also developed by Spark Racing Technology, is known as the SRT05e and eschews the conventional design of having a rear wing in favour of incorporating aerodynamic elements into the chassis and floor.
 The category used a new standardised battery produced by McLaren Applied Technologies and Atieva. Each driver is only allowed to use one car per race, thus the battery life now lasts the whole race instead of half distance.
 The series introduced new brakes, as Spark Racing Technology chose Brembo as the sole supplier of the entire braking system for all the single-seaters: discs, calipers, pads, bells and tandem pump.
 The maximum power output of the cars increased to 250 kW. Cars have a series of pre-set power modes which were introduced to encourage strategic racing without allowing a team to gain a competitive advantage through powertrain development.
 The series also introduced a system officially called "attack mode" or dubbed "Mario Kart mode" in which drivers receive an additional 25 kW of power by driving through a designated area of the circuit off the racing line. The duration of the boost mode and the number of boosts available was meant to only decided shortly ahead of each race by the FIA to stop teams from anticipating its use and incorporating it into race strategy. However, this largely did not happen, with all events except the second race in New York having two attack mode activations of 4 minutes each, with the final race having 3 activations, also of 4 minutes each. 
 The "halo" cockpit protection device was introduced on the chassis to meet the FIA rules that the halo should be involved in all single seater series by 2020.

Sporting regulations
 Races were no longer run to a set number of laps. Rather, they ran for forty-five minutes and complete an additional lap once the time limit has expired.

Results and standings

ePrix

Drivers' Championship standings
Points were awarded to the top ten classified finishers in every race, the pole position starter, and the driver who set the fastest lap, using the following structure:

† – Drivers did not finish the race, but were classified as they completed more than 90% of the race distance.

Voestalpine European races Trophy

Teams' Championship standings

Footnotes

References 

 
Formula E seasons
Formula E
Formula E
Formula E
Formula E